Zinaida Martynovna Portnova (20 February 1926 – 15 January 1944) was a Soviet teenager, partisan and posthumous Hero of the Soviet Union.

Biography
Portnova was born in Leningrad on 20 February 1926. She was the daughter of a working-class Belarusian family. Her father worked at the Kirov Plant. She was a seventh-grade student at the 385th school in Leningrad in 1941, when she left for her grandmother's house in the Vitebsk region. Not long afterwards, Nazi Germany invaded the Soviet Union. An incident with the invading Nazi troops, who hit her grandmother while they were confiscating the cattle, led her to hate the Germans.

In 1942, Portnova joined the Belarusian resistance movement, becoming a member of the local underground Komsomol organization in Obol, Vitebsk Voblast, named Young Avengers. She began by distributing Soviet propaganda leaflets in the German-occupied Belarus, collecting and hiding weapons for Soviet soldiers, and reporting on German troop movements. After learning how to use weapons and explosives from the older members of the group, Portnova participated in sabotage actions at a pump, local power plant, and brick factory. These acts are estimated to have killed upwards of 100 German soldiers.

In 1943, Portnova became employed as a kitchen aide in Obol. In August, she poisoned the food meant for the Nazi garrison stationed there. Immediately falling suspect, she said she was innocent and ate some of the food in front of the Nazis to prove it was not poisoned; after she did not fall ill immediately, they released her. Portnova became sick afterwards, vomiting heavily but eventually recovering from the poison after drinking much whey. After she did not return to work, the Germans realized she had been the culprit and started searching for her. To avoid the Germans, she became a scout of the partisan unit named after Kliment Voroshilov. In a letter sent to her parents that month, she wrote that she is "in partisan unit, beating the Nazis". In October 1943, Portnova joined the VLKSM.

In December 1943 or January 1944, Portnova was sent back to Obol to infiltrate the garrison, discover the reason for the recent Young Avengers failures, then locate and contact the remaining members. She was quickly captured. Reports of her escape vary. One is that, during Gestapo interrogation in the village of Goriany, she took the investigator's pistol off the table, then shot and killed him. When two German soldiers entered after hearing the gunshots, she shot them as well. She then attempted to escape the compound and ran into the woods, where she was caught near the banks of a river.

Another version is that the Gestapo interrogator, in a fit of rage, threw his pistol to the table after threatening to shoot her. Taking the pistol, Portnova shot him. Escaping through the door, she shot a guard in the corridor, then another in the courtyard. After the pistol misfired when Portnova attempted to shoot a guard blocking her access to the street, she was captured.

After being recaptured, Portnova was tortured, possibly for information. She was later driven into the forest and executed or killed during torture on 15 January 1944.

Legacy
On 1 July 1958, Portnova was posthumously declared a Hero of the Soviet Union by the Presidium of the Supreme Soviet. She also received the Order of Lenin. In 1969, the village of Zuya dedicated a commemorative plaque in her honour. She also had numerous Young Pioneer groups named in her honour.

Portnova has had many school teams and groups named after her, as well the museum to the Komsomol, situated on the highway between Polotsk and Vitebsk, and a school in St. Petersburg. There are two monuments to her, a bust in Minsk and an obelisk in the village of Obol.

See also
 List of female Heroes of the Soviet Union

Notes

References

Footnotes

Bibliography

.

External links

Soviet women in World War II
Heroes of the Soviet Union
Resistance members killed by Nazi Germany
Soviet partisans
Belarusian partisans
Female resistance members of World War II
1926 births
1944 deaths
Executed people from Saint Petersburg
Executed Russian women
Child soldiers in World War II
Russian children
Executed children
Executed Soviet people from Russia
Russian people executed by Nazi Germany
Recipients of the Order of Lenin
Soviet children